Voicenotes is the second studio album by American singer Charlie Puth. Almost entirely produced by Puth himself, the album was released by Artist Partner Group and Atlantic Records on May 11, 2018. Five singles have been released from the album, including "Attention" and "How Long". "Attention" peaked at number 5 on the Billboard Hot 100 and "How Long" peaked at number 21.

Puth delayed the album from an early 2018 release date to "perfect" it, including reshooting the album cover. He announced on social media that he would release the album cover and the song "The Way I Am" on May 3. Puth embarked on the Voicenotes Tour in support of the album in North America throughout July and August 2018.

Upon release, the album was commercially successful, peaking at number four on the Billboard 200, and received generally positive reviews from critics, who praised the mature songwriting and Puth's performance; many felt it was an improvement upon Puth's debut album Nine Track Mind. The album received a nomination for the Grammy Award for Best Engineered Album, Non-Classical at the 61st Annual Grammy Awards.

Music
Puth described the sound of the album as "like walking down a dirt road and listening to New Edition in 1989 – and being heartbroken, of course." He also remarked that he wanted a sound akin to the late 1980s "dark R&B" of Babyface, Jimmy Jam, Terry Lewis and Teddy Riley. Puth also stated the album will have no love ballads, explaining he wished to distance himself from the sound of his first album, which was "people nudging [me] in a direction that I didn't want to go in."

Promotion

Singles
"Attention", released as the first single from the album on April 21, 2017, was met with commercial success, peaking at number five on the Billboard Hot 100. "How Long", released as the album's second single on October 5, 2017, peaked at number 21 on the Billboard Hot 100 and reached the top 20 in several markets. "Done for Me", the third single, was released on March 15, 2018, and features Kehlani. "Change" featuring James Taylor was released as the fourth single on March 26, 2018. "The Way I Am" was released as the album's fifth single on July 24, 2018.

Promotional singles
"If You Leave Me Now", featuring Boyz II Men, was released as the album's first promotional single on January 5, 2018, after Puth delayed the album. "The Way I Am" was released as the second promotional single on May 3, 2018, along with the new album cover.

Critical reception

Voicenotes received generally positive reviews from critics. At Metacritic, which assigns a normalized rating out of 100 to reviews from mainstream publications, the album received an average score of 67 based on five reviews, indicating "generally favorable reviews". In a positive review of the album, Spencer Kornhaber of The Atlantic called Voicenotes a "guilty pleasure" and noted that Puth is not aiming for Ed Sheeran "everyguy relatability". Taylor Weatherby of Billboard named Voicenotes the album of the week, praising Puth's rawness, and the collaborations included on the album. Mark Kennedy of The Washington Post praised the album, calling it "perfect pop", and stating that Puth has a fantastic career in front of him. In another positive review of the album, Nicholas Hautman of Us Weekly called the album "perfect for the summer", and called it "perfectly crafted".

In a mixed review of the album, Brittany Spanos of the Rolling Stone gave the album three out of five stars, saying "Puth's efforts to transition from a more mature R&B valiant, but he needed a little more work to be compared to the likes of Justin Timberlake and Nick Jonas."

Commercial performance
Voicenotes debuted at number four on the US Billboard 200 with 58,000 album-equivalent units of which 39,000 were pure album sales. On May 14, 2018, the album was certified gold by the Recording Industry Association of America for combined sales and album-equivalent units of over 500,000 units in the United States.

In 2018, Voicenotes was ranked as the 130th most popular album of the year on the Billboard 200.

Track listing
Credits adapted from liner notes.

All tracks are written and produced by Charlie Puth, except where noted.

Notes
  signifies a co-producer
  signifies an additional producer
 "Boy" is stylized in uppercase letters

Sample credits
 "If You Leave Me Now" contains an interpolation of "I Thought She Knew" by NSYNC
 "Slow It Down" contains an interpolation of "I Can't Go for That (No Can Do)" by Hall & Oates

Personnel
Credits adapted from liner notes.

Musicians
 Charlie Puth – vocals, bass , instruments 
 Kehlani – featured vocals 
 Boyz II Men – featured vocals 
 James Taylor – featured vocals 
 Jan Ozveren – guitar 
 Dmitry Gorodetsky – bass 
 Carl Falk – bass 
 Johan Carlsson – instruments 

Production
 Charlie Puth – production 
 Rickard Göransson – production 
 Jason Evigan – additional production 
 Johan Carlsson – co-production 

Technical personnel
 Charlie Puth – recording  ,mixing
 Ryan Gladieux – Kehlani vocals recording 
 Manny Marroquin – mixing
 Chris Galland – mixing assistance
 Jeff Jackson – mixing assistance
 Dave Kutch – mastering
 Carolyn Tracey – project manager

Artwork
 Alex R. Kirzhner – design
 Jimmy Fontaine – photography
 Billy Walsh – styling
 Michael Kanyon – grooming
 Madison Blue – grooming

Charts

Weekly charts

Year-end charts

Certifications and sales

References

2018 albums
Albums recorded in a home studio
Atlantic Records albums
Charlie Puth albums
Albums produced by Jason Evigan
Albums produced by Johan Carlsson